T.H. Stone Memorial St. Joseph Peninsula State Park is a Florida State Park on the St. Joseph Peninsula near Port St. Joe. It is located off U.S. 98.

Recreational activities
The park has such amenities as beaches, picnicking areas, cabins, and full camping facilities. It also has a visitor center.

There are miles of sugar-white sand; the park's beach has often been ranked among the best in the United States by Dr. Beach. Sunbathing, snorkeling, and swimming are popular warm-weather activities.

Canoeists and kayakers can take in a superb view of the high dunes and sand pine scrub. Outdoor enthusiasts can enjoy fishing, hiking, or bicycling. St. Joseph Park also provides excellent opportunities for bird watching; over 240 species have been sighted there.

See also

St. Joseph Bay
St. Joseph Peninsula

External links

 T.H. Stone Memorial St. Joseph Peninsula State Park at Florida State Parks
 St. Joseph Peninsula State Park at State Parks of the United States
 St. Joseph Peninsula State Park at Absolutely Florida

Parks in Gulf County, Florida
State parks of Florida
Beaches of Florida
Protected areas established in 1967
Beaches of Gulf County, Florida
1967 establishments in Florida